Sphaerodictyaceae is a family of green algae, in the order Chlamydomonadales.

References

External links

Scientific references

Scientific databases

 AlgaeBase
 AlgaTerra database
 Index Nominum Genericorum

Chlorophyceae families
Chlamydomonadales